An interferometer is a device for extracting information from the superposition of multiple waves.

Field and linear interferometers 

Air-wedge shearing interferometer
Astronomical interferometer / Michelson stellar interferometer
Classical interference microscopy
Bath interferometer (common path)
Cyclic interferometer
Diffraction-grating interferometer (white light)
Double-slit interferometer
Dual-polarization interferometry
Fabry–Pérot interferometer
Fizeau interferometer 
Fourier-transform interferometer
Fresnel interferometer (e.g. Fresnel biprism, Fresnel mirror or Lloyd's mirror)
Fringes of Equal Chromatic Order interferometer (FECO)
Gabor hologram
Gires–Tournois etalon
Heterodyne interferometer (see heterodyne)
Holographic interferometer
Jamin interferometer
Laser Doppler vibrometer
Linnik interferometer (microscopy)
LUPI variant of Michelson
Lummer–Gehrcke interferometer
Mach–Zehnder interferometer
Martin–Puplett interferometer
Michelson interferometer
Mirau interferometer (also known as a Mirau objective) (microscopy)
Moiré interferometer (see moiré pattern)
Multi-beam interferometer (microscopy)
Near-field interferometer
Newton interferometer (see Newton's rings)
Nomarski interferometer
 Nonlinear Michelson interferometer / Step-phase Michelson interferometer
N-slit interferometer
Phase-shifting interferometer
Planar lightwave circuit interferometer (PLC)
Photon Doppler velocimeter interferometer (PDV)
Polarization interferometer (see also Babinet–Soleil compensator)
Point diffraction interferometer
Rayleigh interferometer
Sagnac interferometer
Schlieren interferometer (phase-shifting)
Shearing interferometer (lateral and radial)
Twyman–Green interferometer
Talbot–Lau interferometer
Watson interferometer (microscopy)
White-light interferometer (see also Optical coherence tomography)
White-light scatterplate interferometer (white-light) (microscopy)
Young's double-slit interferometer
Zernike phase-contrast microscopy

Intensity and nonlinear interferometers 

intensity interferometer
 intensity optical correlator
frequency-resolved optical gating (FROG)
Spectral phase interferometry for direct electric-field reconstruction (SPIDER)

Quantum optics interferometers 
Hong–Ou–Mandel interferometer (HOM) (see Hong–Ou–Mandel effect)
Franson interferometer
Hanbury–Brown Twiss interferometer
Polariton Interferometer

Interferometers outside optics 
Acoustic interferometer
Atom interferometer
Neutron interferometer
Ramsey interferometer
Mini grail interferometer
Aharonov–Bohm effect
Interferometric synthetic-aperture radar (a radar-based 3-d surface mapping)
Superconducting quantum interference devices (SQUIDs)
White–Juday warp-field interferometer

See also 
Atacama Large Millimeter Array

 
Interferometers